The Sardinella razorbelly minnow (Salmostoma sardinella) is a species of ray-finned fish in the genus Salmostoma. It occurs in the lower reaches of rivers in India, Bangladesh and Myanmar.

References 

 

sardinella
Fish of Bangladesh
Fish of Myanmar
Fish of India
Fish of Thailand
Fish described in 1844
Taxobox binomials not recognized by IUCN